UAPS20 is an autopilot system that can be installed on an RHIB boat to obtain a low-cost unmanned surface vehicle.

The system is manufactured by SIEL (Italy) and is composed of:
 an Autopilot Control unit (ACU) installed on a 7.5 RHIB Rigid Hulled Inflatable Boat.
 an Operator Control Unit (OCS) to remotely monitor and control the USV
 an optional Central Monitoring Station (CMS) to monitor a fleet of up 15 USV units.

Features
The UAPS20 is a brand of a multi-mission, low-cost unmanned surface vehicles. The platform is capable of carrying up to 2100 kg of payload for different tasks, such as:
 Remote surveillance using sonar, radar, and camera
 Remote mine hunting and countermeasures
 Protection of harbors
 Naval targets
 remotely operated underwater vehicle ( ROUV or ROV) autonomous underwater vehicle (AUV) remote launch/control platform

The autopilot system allows full autonomous modes or remote control mode from the OCS station. Currently 25 systems are already in operation.

General specifications
Length: 
Weight: 1250 kg (without payload)
Engine: 150 Hp 4 stroke outboard
Payload: up to 2100 kg
Speed:

Similar USV 
Protector USV 
Spartan Scout

References

SIEL page on UAPS20

Unmanned surface vehicles